Werur Airport (also known as Douglas Mac Arthur Airport)  is an airport in Tambrauw, Southwest Papua, Indonesia.  It replaced the smaller, former World War II airfield, Sansapor Airfield.

Airlines and destinations

Passenger

Background
The government said they will provide Rp30 billion, or about US$2.5 million, from the state budget for the construction of the airfield. In the meantime, Gabriel Asem, the head of Tambrauw district, remarked that the administration has budgeted Rp9 billion, or about US$752 thousand, for the construction of the airport and Rp3 billion, or about US$250 thousand, for acquiring the land for the airport.

The Werur Airport will facilitate the locals and tourists to reach Raja Ampat and other locations in Southwest Papua.

References

External links

Werur Airport Information
Hari ini bandara werur beroperasi

Airports in Southwest Papua